The Red Line is the older and longer line of the MetroLink light rail service in St. Louis, Missouri, United States. It serves 29 stations across three counties and two states in Greater St. Louis.

History
Transit planning along the Airport/Central Corridor began as early as 1971, when it was selected as the region's primary target for further study. In 1983, funding was approved to evaluate five mode alternatives, which culminated in a 1984 draft environmental impact statement. After a series of public hearings, the East–West Gateway Council of Governments, a council composed of the region's local governments, adopted light rail as the preferred mode alternative.

The project's capital expense budget was $287.7 million (equivalent to $ in  dollars), which covered design and engineering, procurement, construction, and testing.

Arts in Transit 
In the initial design phase of MetroLink, Metro's Arts in Transit program commissioned a group of artists to design unique bridge piers for MetroLink viaducts. Collaborating with architects and engineers, the artists designed the arched supports that reflect an inverted version of the arch motif used throughout the MetroLink system design. The bridge pier system is a signature of MetroLink design and appears in the subsequent St. Clair and Cross County alignments.

In 2008, the Arts in Transit program commissioned a work for the alignment along Interstate 70 near Lambert Airport. Titled St. Louis Rhythm and created by Richard Elliot, it was made using roadway reflectors on 16 concrete Jersey barriers that are activated by the headlights of passing cars.

In 2011, another Arts in Transit commission was installed on the shared alignment near Interstate 64 on the bridge over Vandeventer Avenue. Titled Blue Train and created by Clark Wiegman, this cubist locomotive represents the opening eight bars of the melody of “St. Louis Blues.” During the day, this piece appears as an oversized locomotive spewing a trail of notes or an unfurling piano roll. At night, it becomes a geometric abstraction about linear dynamism and the implied form of the bridge punching through the surrounding ambient light.

2022 Flooding 
On July 26, 2022, the Delmar Loop and Forest Park-DeBaliviere stations were flooded in a catastrophic flash flooding event that shut the system down for close to 72 hours. Damage to the stations, rolling stock, ballast, signaling infrastructure, fiber optics, etc. is estimated to be $40 million.

On September 5, 2022, Metro announced new schedules to accommodate repairs being made to the system. It is estimated repairs could take six months or longer. Currently, the Red Line is operating at all of its 29 stations but with restricted speeds in some flood-damaged sections.

Route

The 38-mile (61 km) Red Line alignment begins at Lambert St. Louis International Airport, making stops at the Terminal 1 and Terminal 2 stations. It then proceeds through Kinloch before making a stop at the North Hanley station near Bel-Ridge. It makes 2 stops (UMSL North & UMSL South) at the University of Missouri St. Louis located in Normandy. After departing UMSL, trains divert south onto the former Wabash/Norfolk & Western Railroad's Union Depot line that once brought passenger trains from Ferguson to Union Station. It then travels into Pagedale stopping at the Rock Road station and then at Wellston's namesake station on Plymouth Street.  From here, the Red Line crosses the St. Louis City/County boundary line at Skinker Boulevard, making a stop at the Delmar Loop station which serves the popular Delmar Loop area and is located just below the original Wabash Railroad's Delmar Station building. At the following station, Forest Park-DeBaliviere, the Red Line meets the Blue Line. From this station the two services share a track alignment with each other until the Blue Line terminates at the Fairview Heights station in Illinois.

Shared Alignment 

From the Forest Park-DeBaliviere station, the Red and Blue lines share the same set of tracks for the next 16 stations. Continuing east, the Central West End and Cortex stations serve the popular Central West End neighborhood, Washington University Medical Center and Cortex Innovation Community. The Grand station transfers with the busy #70 MetroBus line and serves Saint Louis University and its hospital. Next, the Union Station, Civic Center, Stadium, 8th & Pine, Convention Center, and Laclede's Landing stations serve downtown St. Louis and its many popular attractions. Crossing the historic Eads Bridge into Illinois, the line serves the East Riverfront, 5th & Missouri, Emerson Park, Jackie Joyner-Kersee Center, and Washington Park stations in East St. Louis, Illinois. At the next station, Fairview Heights, the Blue Line terminates and the Red Line continues south to Belleville, Illinois to its terminus at the Shiloh-Scott station located at Scott Air Force Base.

Stations
From Lambert Airport to Shiloh-Scott (west to east)

Extensions in progress

MidAmerica Airport 
A 5.2-mile (8.4 km) expansion of the Red Line from Shiloh-Scott to MidAmerica St. Louis Airport in Mascoutah received $96 million in funding from the State of Illinois in 2019. The expansion will include a 2.6-mile double-track section, a 2.6-mile single-track section and a passenger station at the end of the alignment at MidAmerica Airport. Design work was completed in the summer of 2022 and a request for proposals was released that November. Construction on the expansion is expected to begin by March 2023 and be operational by spring 2025.

Previous extension proposals
These extensions were proposed when Metro released its Moving Transit Forward plan in 2010. Most are now defunct as regional leadership has said their current focus is on the City and North County corridors and not previous expansion proposals.

St. Charles Corridor
Lambert Airport to St. Charles County: Possible plans to expand MetroLink 16 to 20-miles (26-32 km) from Lambert Airport northwestward to St. Charles County were abandoned after St. Charles County voters rejected a sales tax in 1996 to fund an extension; subsequently, all MetroBus service was ended. If the extension was funded, the route would have used the Old St. Charles Bridge (now demolished) as a crossing over the Missouri River to the City of St. Charles, St. Peters, and O'Fallon. It is not likely to be considered in the future as St. Charles County residents still largely oppose light rail expansion.

Madison County Corridors
East St. Louis to Alton/Edwardsville: A study in 2005 was performed to investigate the potential costs, ridership, and impacts of extending Metrolink into Madison County, Illinois. According to the East-West Gateway Council of Governments, there are two recommended alignments for Madison County. Both of the alignments will start from the 5th & Missouri station out of East St Louis in St. Clair County to Granite City, Collinsville, Glen Carbon, Edwardsville, East Alton, Wood River, and Alton in Madison County, Illinois 21 to 23-miles (34-37 km) away. The alignments would have split in Madison, Illinois. In order to plan any Madison County extensions, Metro will have to collaborate with Madison County Transit.

See also
 List of St. Louis MetroLink stations
 Blue Line (St. Louis MetroLink)
 St. Clair County Transit District

References

External links

 St. Clair County Transit District 

 
Metro Transit (St. Louis)
MetroLink (St. Louis)
Light rail in Missouri
Light rail in Illinois
Airport rail links in the United States
Proposed railway lines in Missouri
Passenger rail transportation in Missouri
1993 establishments in Missouri